Ostrava main railway station, (abbreviated ), is a railway station in city part Ostrava-Přívoz and main train terminus of Ostrava, third biggest city in the Czech Republic.

Tracks
Station is an important transport junction. All types of trains operated by Czech Railways or private transport companies RegioJet and Leo Express stops here. Station is located on a crossing of four railway lines:
 321 Opava východ – Český Těšín
 323 Ostrava – Valašské Meziříčí
 270 Bohumín - Olomouc (main) - Česká Třebová 
  (freight only)

History
First train reached the new-built station on 1 May 1847. Position on the international line Krakow – Vienna (Emperor Ferdinand Northern Railway) and raise of mining industry in whole Silesia brought the station significant importance. In 1869 track to Frýdlant nad Ostravicí was connected. Because of capacity reasons, station was expanded for the first time between 1892-1893. Since August 1894, tram line operates transport to the centre of Moravian Ostrava. The station took the name Ostrava hlavní nádraží in 1946.

In the mid-1960s resolution about a radical reconstruction of whole city part Ostrava-sever (Ostrava-North) was accomplished including a plan of the new modern station realised by architect Lubor Lacina (1967) in Brussels style (Czechoslovakian design style inspired by aesthetics of Expo 58 in Brussels). Works were finished eight years later. In the front of the building a new terminus of tram, trolleybus and taxi transport was created in collaboration with Lacina’s sister, sculpturer Sylvie Lacinová-Jílková. A lot of unique architectonical and interior design features disappeared after last reconstruction in 2007.

Changes of station names
 1. 5. 1847 – Ostrau
 1881 – Ostrau Hauptbahn
 1895 – Mährisch Ostrau
 1900 – Mährisch Ostrau – Přívoz
 1. 5. 1905 – Mährisch Ostrau – Oderfurt
 1921 – Moravská Ostrava – Přívoz
 22. 5. 1937 – Moravská Ostrava hl. n.
 1940 – 1945 Mährisch Ostrau Hbf. – Moravská Ostrava hl. n.
 1946 – Ostrava hl. n.

References

Hlavni Nadrazi
Railway stations opened in 1847
Brutalist architecture in the Czech Republic
19th-century establishments in Bohemia
Buildings and structures in Ostrava
Hlavní nádraží
Railway stations in the Czech Republic opened in 1847